Melinda O. Fee (born Melinda Evelyn Fee; October 7, 1942 – March 24, 2020) was an American actress who starred in films and on television.

Early life
Her mother was actress Astrid Allwyn, and her father was Charles Fee, an insurance executive. Fee graduated with honors with a BA in drama from the University of Southern California, after which she studied for a year at the University of Uppsala in Sweden.

Career
Her first starring role was on the television series Love of Life. Most of her other television roles were on soap operas like Guiding Light as Charlotte Waring Fletcher Bauer from 1971 to 1973, Days of Our Lives as Mary Anderson from 1981 to 1982, and Santa Barbara as Olivia Welles from 1987 to 1988. She starred with David McCallum on the short-lived television series The Invisible Man (1975–76), playing the title character's wife, Dr. Kate Westin. Fee also starred in made-for-TV movies, and guest starred on many 1970s television series, including Quincy, M.E., The Bionic Woman, CHiPs, Eight is Enough, and Dallas. In 1984, Fee served as temporary replacement for Brenda Dickson as Jill Foster Abbott on The Young and the Restless.

She appeared in the feature films The Unkissed Bride (1966), Fade to Black (1980), and A Nightmare on Elm Street 2: Freddy's Revenge (1985). Fee made guest appearances on television series including My Favorite Martian, Lost in Space, Knight Rider, Beverly Hills, 90210, and Match Game with Gene Rayburn.

Personal life
Fee married Steven S. Harrison in 1985. She died on March 24, 2020..

Filmography

References

External links
 
 
 

1942 births
2020 deaths
Actresses from Los Angeles
American film actresses
American soap opera actresses
American television actresses
21st-century American women